Bijelo Brdo is a village in the Erdut municipality in eastern Croatia. It is connected by the D213 road and by R202 railway. It has a total of 1,961 inhabitants (2011).

Geography
The village is situated 15 km east from Osijek, in the Slavonia region on the banks of the Stara Drava branch, in the micro-region of Erdutska kosa, at an altitude of 93m above sea level. It covers an area of 36.64 km2.

History
Bijelo Brdo is important for archeological findings from the Bronze Age (Transdanubian cultural group) and two medieval cemeteries: one Avar-Slavic from VII-IX. century and another from X-XI. century, which became the eponymous site of the Bijelo Brdo culture. Before the Ottoman rule, the village was once called Trnovac, the neighboring Hungarians called it Dorno. During the Ottoman rule, the population from upper Podrinje and Polimlje settled there. During the Vienna War (1683–1699), at the time of the Turkish withdrawal the settlement was destroyed and the inhabitants fled to Bosnia. A considerable number of Serbs, in the almost desolate Trnovac, settled in the time of the Great Migrations of the Serbs under Arsenije III Čarnojević. In 1706, the village numbered 63 houses and in that year became part of a Dalj estate. The colonization of Slavonia was carried out in a systematic fashion through centuries but particularly during the period of  WWII. Among people inhabiting poor areas Slavonia was famed as a promised land which could feed large numbers of people, where there was a lot of fertile land and favorable living conditions.

Culture
 Church of St. Nicholas, built between 1764 and 1809, reconstructed in 1996.

Demographics

The 2011 census had a total of 1,961 inhabitants. The 2001 census had a total of 2,119 inhabitants in 720 households. 1991 census, a total of 2,400 inhabitants, out of which Serbs 1,941 (80.87%), Croats 217 (9.04%), Yugoslavs 97 (4.04%), and other smaller communities.

Sport
 NK BSK Bijelo Brdo
Bijelo Brdo Chess Club

Notable people
 Kuzman Stanić (1825–1898), parish priest of Timişoara
Vasilije Trbić (1881–1962), Serbian Chetnik commander in Macedonia

References

Populated places in Osijek-Baranja County